Filipino singer Sarah Geronimo has released 13 studio albums, 4 video albums, one live album, one compilation album, 4 soundtrack albums and 31 singles throughout her career. Widely referred as the “Ultimate Pop Superstar”, Geronimo's debut album “Popstar: A Dream Come True” is the all-time best-selling debut album in the Philippines with sales exceeding 310,000 copies (7× Platinum). Her sophomore album “Sweet Sixteen” was also a commercial success, achieving 3× Platinum by PARI.

Her 10th studio album “Expressions” reached Platinum status in its first 3 months. In 2014, Geronimo was recognised as the Best-selling Filipino artist of 2014 in the 22nd World Music Awards. The next year, she made her debut on the Billboard charts with “The Breakup Playlist: The Official Movie Soundtrack” peaking at No. 9 on World Albums. As of 2015, Geronimo is listed among the list of Filipino artists with the most Platinum records ever. At the 2016 Awit Awards, Geronimo's platinum-selling “The Great Unknown” won Album of the Year, making it her second consecutive win (with Perfectly Imperfect also achieving 2× Platinum status).

Albums

Studio albums

Soundtrack albums

Compilation albums

Live albums

Video and DVD releases

Singles

Songwriting credits

Soundtracks

Other appearances

Other VCD/DVD releases
 (2004) Sing Along With Sarah Vol.1
Format: VCD/DVD
 (2007) Sing Along With Sarah Vol.2
Format: VCD

Notes

References

Discographies of Filipino artists
Pop music discographies
discography